Harrowsmith is a community in South Frontenac, Ontario, north of Kingston, once noted for its cheddar cheese, produced by the Harrowsmith Cheese Factory. As a farming village in an area resettled by many back-to-the-land emigrants from urban areas in the 1960s-1980s, the village gave its name to the country living magazine Harrowsmith.

Harrowsmith is home to Centennial Park, a large park adjacent to Rd 38 which includes soccer fields, baseball diamonds, play structures and hosts many community activities.

References

Communities in Frontenac County